Radhe Devi is an Indian bridal wear designer and social worker. In 2021, she was awarded Padma Shri by the Indian Government for her contribution in Arts.

Early life
Devi is from Wangjing Sorokhaibam Leikai in the Thoubal district of Manipur.

Career
Devi started her career at age of 25 when she learnt the process of Potloi. She has also designed costumes for the Khamba-Thoibi dance. She is also involved in social work and works for women empowerment.

Awards
Padma Shri in 2021

References

Living people
Recipients of the Padma Shri in arts
People from Manipur
Year of birth missing (living people)